Zula is a village in central Eritrea. It may also refer to:

Places 
 Zula, Iran, a village in West Azerbaijan Province
 Zula, Kentucky, an unincorporated community in Wayne County, Kentucky, US
 Zula River, in Mexico
 Gulf of Zula, on the Eritrean coast of the Red Sea

Other uses 
 Zula (app), a mobile application
 Zula language, a Bantu language
 The Zula Patrol, an American animated series
 Zula, the first bred Abyssinian cat
 Zula Pogorzelska (1896–1936), Polish cabaret and film actor
 Zula Brown Toole (1868–1947), American newspaper publisher